Adnan Haxhaj (born 16 September 1988 in Vushtrri) is a Kosovar–Albanian footballer who plays as a centre back for KF Besa Pejë in the First Football League of Kosovo.

Career
In 2019, Haxhaj joined KF Besa Pejë.

Career statistics

Club

Honours
FC Prishtina
Superleague of Kosovo (2): 2011–12, 2012–13
Kosovar Cup (1): 2012–13
Kosovar Supercup (1): 2012–13

References

External links

1988 births
Living people
Sportspeople from Vushtrri
Kosovo Albanians
Kosovan footballers
Association football defenders
FC Prishtina players
KF Vllaznia Shkodër players
KF Llapi players
KF Liria players
KF Drenica players
KF Ferizaj players
KF Besa players
Kategoria Superiore players
Football Superleague of Kosovo players
Kosovan expatriate footballers
Expatriate footballers in Albania
Kosovan expatriate sportspeople in Albania